Maria Krahe (born 10 August 1970) is a Brazilian sailor. She competed in the women's 470 event at the 2000 Summer Olympics.

References

External links
 

1970 births
Living people
Brazilian female sailors (sport)
Olympic sailors of Brazil
Sailors at the 2000 Summer Olympics – 470
Place of birth missing (living people)